The 2022–23 Boston University Terriers Men's ice hockey season is the 95th season of play for the program. They represent Boston University in the 2022–23 NCAA Division I men's ice hockey season and for the 39th season in the Hockey East conference. The Terriers are coached by Jay Pandolfo, in his first season, and play their home games at Agganis Arena.

Season

Departures

Recruiting

Roster
As of August 26, 2022.

|}

Standings

Schedule and results

|-
!colspan=12 style=";" | Regular Season

|-
!colspan=12 ! style=""; | 

|-
!colspan=12 ! style=""; | 

|-
!colspan=12 style=";" | 

|-
!colspan=12 style=";" |

Scoring statistics

Goaltending statistics

Rankings

USCHO did not release a poll in weeks 1 and 13.

References

2022-23
2022–23 Hockey East men's ice hockey season
2022–23 NCAA Division I men's ice hockey by team
Boston University Terriers men's ice hockey
Boston University Terriers men's ice hockey
Boston University Terriers men's ice hockey
Boston University Terriers men's ice hockey